Erik von Amsberg (October 21, 1908 – 1980) was a German Army colonel, serving as Adolf Hitler's aide for the Wehrmacht from July to October 1944, as temporary replacement of Gen. Rudolf Schmundt.

References

1908 births
1980 deaths
German Army officers of World War II